Greasy Kid Stuff! is the fourth album led by pianist Harold Mabern which was recorded in 1970 and released on the Prestige label.

Reception

Allmusic awarded the album 3 stars, calling it "Excellent advanced hard bop music that hints at fusion".

Track listing 
All compositions by Harold Mabern except where noted
 "Greasy Kid Stuff" - 8:20   
 "I Haven't Got Anything Better to Do" (Lee Pockriss, Paul Vance) - 6:00   
 "XKE" - 6:45   
 "Alex the Great" - 7:15   
 "I Want You Back" (Berry Gordy, Freddie Perren, Alphonzo Mizell, Deke Richards) - 5:35   
 "John Neely-Beautiful People" - 8:25

Personnel 
Harold Mabern - piano, electric piano
Lee Morgan - trumpet
Hubert Laws - flute, tenor saxophone
Joe Jones - guitar (track 5)
Buster Williams - bass, electric bass
Idris Muhammad - drums

References 

 

Harold Mabern albums
1970 albums
Prestige Records albums
Albums produced by Bob Porter (record producer)
Albums recorded at Van Gelder Studio